The 2014 Enfield Council election took place on 22 May 2014 to elect members of Enfield London Borough Council in London, England. The whole council was up for election and the Labour party retained overall control of the council, increasing their majority over the Conservative party by five seats.

Background
The last election in 2010 saw Labour winning a majority with 36 seats, compared to 27 for the Conservatives. No other parties held seats.

Election result
Labour retained control, winning 41 seats, five of them gained from the Conservatives who dropped to 22 seats. Labour dominated in the east and south of the borough, retaining all their existing seats, while the Conservatives held most of their seats in the centre and west of the borough, though they lost two seats to Labour in Southgate Green ward, as well as single seats in Bush Hill Park, Chase and Winchmore Hill wards. For the second consecutive election, there was no representation from other parties on the council.

The Greens fielded candidates in every ward for the second successive election and finished third in the election in terms of votes cast. The Liberal Democrats performed poorly: standing in only eight of the 21 wards and only picking up 1% of the overall vote, they finished fifth, with UKIP in fourth.

Save Chase Farm, who won three seats on the council in 2006, did not stand any candidates after the closure of the A&E department at Chase Farm Hospital, though one of their former councillors, Kieran McGregor, stood for the National Health Action Party in Town ward. The BNP and TUSC also fielded candidates. There were also five independent candidates.

Ward results

References

2014
Enfield